Maria do Céu de Oliveira Antunes (born July 10, 1970 in Abrantes) is a Portuguese politician. She has a degree in Biochemistry from the Faculty of Sciences and Technologies of the University of Coimbra and has a postgraduate degree in Quality Management and Food Safety from the Instituto Superior de Ciências da Saúde Egas Moniz. She was responsible for the Ministry of Agriculture in XXII Constitutional Government from October 26, 2019. In January 2022, she was elected to the Assembly of the Republic on the list of the victorious Socialist Party (PS), as a representative of Santarém District, and was reappointed as Minister of Agriculture and Food.

Before that, she had been Secretary of State for Regional Development in the XXI Constitutional Government of February 18 to October 26, 2019, and President of the Municipality of Abrantes for 9 years.

Controversies

Jorge Ferreira Dias case
During her 9-year term as Mayor of Abrantes, Maria do Céu de Albuquerque got involved in controversies with construction entrepreneur Jorge Ferreira Dias, over land disputes. This case became more visible through the reporting of Ana Leal on TVI.

References

1970 births
Living people
Agriculture ministers of Portugal
Women government ministers of Portugal
Socialist Party (Portugal) politicians
University of Coimbra alumni